Florian Cerny (born 4 October 1946 in Bavaria) is a German-Australian actor and operatic baritone.

References

External links 

 
 Florian Cerny on AllMusic

1946 births
Living people
Musicians from Bavaria
German operatic baritones